Heikki Eidsvoll Holmås (born 28 June 1972 in Voss) is a Norwegian politician for the Socialist Left Party (SV). He served as Minister of International Development from 2012 to 2013 being the last to serve in the position until Nikolai Astrup in 2018.

Personal life 
Holmås is son of librarian/writer Stig Holmås and engineer/textile worker Ingebjørg Monsen.

Heikki Holmås married his wife in 2012. In 2013 his stepfather died in the In Amenas terror attack.

Board game player 
Heikki Holmås is a former Diplomacy player and won the 1994 Norway Championship.

Career
He has served as member of the Parliament of Norway, representing Oslo from 2001 – 2012. He previously served as a deputy representative from 1997 – 2001. He is nominated on the top spot on Oslo SV's ballot for the 2013 Norwegian parliamentary election.

Holmås finished upper secondary school at Bergen Cathedral School, in Bergen from 1988 to 1991. Before entering politics, he worked as a waste collection worker in the Municipality of Bergen.

Holmås has been a columnist in both the woman's magazine Kamille and in the left-wing newspaper Klassekampen. He has contributed with an article in a book about climate change, Kan hende det gjelder å redde vår jord – Om venstresiden og klimapolitikken published in Norwegian in 2009 by Manifest.

References

External links

Heikki's blog in Norwegian

1972 births
Living people
People educated at the Bergen Cathedral School
Politicians from Oslo
Socialist Left Party (Norway) politicians
Members of the Storting
Ministers of International Development of Norway
21st-century Norwegian politicians
Norwegian columnists